Exarchos may refer to:
 Exarch, a governor in the Byzantine Empire with extended authority over a province at some distance from the capital Constantinople
 Exarchos, Grevena, a village in Greece
 Exarchos, Phthiotis, a village in Greece